Jaan Uri (19 September 1875 Kambja Parish, Tartu County - 14 January 1942 Lesnoy, Kirov Oblast, Russia) was an Estonian politician. He was a member of Estonian Constituent Assembly. On 21 May 1919, he resigned his position and he was replaced by Hans Priimägi.

References

1875 births
1942 deaths
Members of the Estonian Constituent Assembly